Altstadt is the German language word for "old town", and generally refers to the historical town or city centre within the old town or city wall, in contrast to younger suburbs outside. Neustadt (new town), the logical opposite of Altstadt, mostly stands for a part of the "Altstadt" in modern sense, sometimes only a few years younger than the oldest part, e. g. a late medieval enlargement.

Germany 
Most German towns have an Altstadt, even though the ravages of war have destroyed many of them, especially during the Thirty Years' War (1618–1648). Another notable example was during the Nine Years' War (1688–1697), where Mélac's aggressive tactics devastated many cities and large parts of South Western Germany, like the Heidelberg Castle.

Allied strategic bombing during World War II destroyed nearly all large cities, with the exception of Regensburg and Heidelberg. Many smaller towns remained intact, for example Bamberg, Konstanz, Passau, Tübingen, Dinkelsbühl, Quedlinburg and Wismar. Some Altstadt parts in Freiburg, Erfurt, Rothenburg ob der Tauber, Weimar and others have been restored. But most destroyed bigger German old towns were not reconstructed. Important old towns like those of Hildesheim, Braunschweig, Frankfurt, Kassel and Pforzheim were largely lost or only reconstructed in limited areas.

Recent efforts of Altstadt reconstructions can be found in Dresden (Neumarkt area), Potsdam (the old market and city palace) and Frankfurt (Römerberg around the Cathedral).

Examples of Altstadt districts in cities and towns

Austria

Baden bei Wien
Gmünd, Carinthia
Gmünd, Lower Austria
Graz
Judenburg
Salzburg
Schärding
Steyr
Zell am See

Germany

Aachen
Amberg
Baden-Baden
Bamberg (a World Heritage Site)
Bayreuth
Bernkastel-Kues
Bietigheim
Büdingen
Celle
Cologne (Altstadt Nord & Süd)
Dinkelsbühl
Dresden (Dresden old town)
Düsseldorf (Altstadt (Düsseldorf))
Erfurt
Freiburg (:de:Altstadt (Freiburg im Breisgau))
Gernsbach
Görlitz (:de:Görlitzer Altstadt)
Goslar (a World Heritage Site)
Güstrow
Hamburg (Altstadt)
Heidelberg (:de:Heidelberger Altstadt)
Konstanz
Landshut
Limburg an der Lahn
Lindau
Lübeck (a World Heritage Site)
Lüneburg
Marbach am Neckar
Marburg
Mosbach
Munich (Altstadt-Lehel)
Neustrelitz
Nuremberg
Nördlingen
Putbus
Quedlinburg (a World Heritage Site)
Ravensburg
Regensburg (a World Heritage Site)
Rostock
Rothenburg ob der Tauber
Rüdesheim
Schwerin
Stade
Stralsund (a World Heritage Site)
Tangermünde
Trier
Tübingen
Überlingen
Waren (Müritz)
Weingarten (Baden)
Weinheim
Wernigerode
Wetzlar (:de:Historische Altstadt Wetzlar)
Wismar (a World Heritage Site)

Switzerland

Baden (AG)
Bellinzona
Bern (UNESCO)
Biel/Bienne
Bremgarten (AG)
Brugg
Bulle
Delémont
Eglisau (ZH)
Fribourg
Greifensee (ZH)
Gruyères
Kyburg (ZH)
Lausanne
Lavaux
Luzern
Müstair
Rapperswil (SG)
Regensberg (ZH)
Romont
Murten
Rheinau
Schaffhausen
Solothurn
St. Gallen
Stein am Rhein
Vevey
Wil (SG)
Winterthur
Zürich

Other towns
Notable Altstadt districts in cities that used to be inhabited also by a German-speaking population:
Old Town, Prague
Old Town, Tallinn

Notable Altstadt districts in cities and towns that were destroyed:
Altstadt (Königsberg)

Gallery